The 1947–48 NCAA men's basketball season began in December 1947, progressed through the regular season and conference tournaments, and concluded with the 1948 NCAA basketball tournament championship game on March 23, 1948, at Madison Square Garden in New York, New York. The Kentucky Wildcats won their first NCAA national championship with a 58–42 victory over the Baylor Bears.

Season headlines 

 In 1995, the Premo-Porretta Power Poll retroactively selected Kentucky as its national champion for the 1947–48 season.

Conference membership changes

Regular season

Conference winners and tournaments

Statistical leaders

Post-season tournaments

NCAA tournament

Semifinals & finals 

 Third Place – Holy Cross 60, Kansas State 54

National Invitation tournament

Semifinals & finals 

 Third Place – Western Kentucky State 61, DePaul 59

Awards

Consensus All-American teams

Major player of the year awards 

 Helms Player of the Year: Ed Macauley, Saint Louis

Other major awards 

 NIT/Haggerty Award (Top player in New York City metro area): Dolph Schayes, NYU

Coaching changes 

A number of teams changed coaches during the season and after it ended.

References